Parliamentary elections were held in Cameroon on 28 May 1978. The country was a one-party state at the time, with the Cameroonian National Union as the sole legal party. 2,618 candidates ran for a place on the CNU list, with 120 eventually winning a place on it, equal to the number seats available in the National Assembly, winning all of them with a 98.0% turnout.

Results

References

Cameroon
1978 in Cameroon
Elections in Cameroon
One-party elections
Single-candidate elections
May 1978 events in Africa